Synaphea constricta is a shrub endemic to Western Australia.

It blooms between June and September producing yellow flowers.

It is found in a small area in the Wheatbelt region of Western Australia between Wongan Hills, Kellerberrin and Kondinin where it grows in sandy-clay-loamy soils over laterite.

References

Eudicots of Western Australia
constricta
Endemic flora of Western Australia
Plants described in 1995